John Battersby Crompton Lamburn  (1893 – 1972) was a British writer, younger brother of Richmal Crompton, who was best known for her "William" books for boys. She was said to have drawn part of her inspiration for the character of William from him.

During World War I Lamburn served in Rhodesia in the British South Africa Police. Afterwards he joined a shipping firm in China, where he travelled widely. Returning to England in the 1930s he took to writing fiction, mainly under the pseudonym "John Lambourne". He probably is best known for his fantasy The Kingdom That Was.

In World War II he served in the RAF. Afterwards, under the name "John Crompton", he wrote mainly non-fiction on natural history themes. Beyond his published works little is known about Lamburn's life and works, because most of his notes were destroyed in an act of arson.

Life and work 

John Battersby Crompton Lamburn (June 1893 —  3 April 1972) was a British writer, the younger brother of the more popular author Richmal Crompton. She was the author of many novels, but best known for her hugely popular "William" books for boys.

He wrote fiction mainly under the pseudonym "John Lambourne", or "John B. C. Lambourne", and wrote popular books on natural history under the name "John Crompton". He probably is best known for his fantasy The Kingdom That Was (1931).

As Trooper 1757 Lamburn, J. B. C. of the British South Africa Police, he served from 19 September 1913 to 30 November 1919, a period which spans World War I. In both his fiction and non-fiction he drew on his police experiences, but according to the official BSAP site nothing is known of his service. (This is no evidence for anything worse than that he never achieved any special prominence in the service, as little is known of the service of most of the troopers of those days.) On leaving the Force he moved to the Far East and travelled widely in China. Returning to England in the 1930s he took to full-time writing, by now drawing on his experience of travel in East Asia as well.

Little is widely known about Lamburn's life and works, but a few details can be gleaned or inferred from various sources.

According partly to Lamburn's own account of himself, on one of his book covers, he was educated at Bury Grammar School and Manchester University. His father was the Rev Edward John Sewell Lamburn, and apparently intended his son to follow in his own footsteps and go into the Anglican Church, but instead, in 1913 at the age of twenty, young Lamburn joined the Rhodesian Mounted Police of the British South Africa Police or BSAP, as a trooper. Presumably this was to the considerable consternation of his parents, and his age at the time suggests that he did not complete a degree course at Manchester.
 
Consistently with that suspicion, the second of his two elder sisters was Richmal Crompton Lamburn, a novelist and the author of the hugely popular "William" stories, and she was said to have derived part of her inspiration for her leading character, William Brown — a rough diamond — from her young brother.  This all suggests that Lamburn might well have been very unpromising ecclesiastical material, and deeply unenthusiastic about his studies. Certainly some of his autobiographical reminiscences on the vigour and variety of his life in Southern Africa and elsewhere, suggest that as a very plausible inference; see for example some passages in his book "The Hunting Wasp", especially chapter 4 (III: Locust and Cockroach Hunters) and chapter 6 The Fly Hunters.

He described his fellow-troopers as being about as hard-bitten a crew as it would be possible to find anywhere. He stayed with the BSAP throughout World War I. His duties included patrolling large areas of undeveloped country, and taking charge of isolated up-country out-stations. He found it to be a glorious life in country as unspoilt as any that Selous hunted. It was full of big game – in his own words: “...country we shall see no more.”

In 1919 he joined a shipping firm and went to China. For 13 years he operated from Harbin at the north of Manchuria down to Hong Kong in the south. His travels took him to the remotest regions of China. It is deeply regrettable that his African and Chinese notes were effectively all destroyed in a deed of arson He generally spent his leave on his own in shooting trips in Portuguese East Africa (present-day Mozambique). In 1932 he resigned from the firm and “came home” (which among the colonial English of the day, meant “going to Britain” — usually England — whether they had ever seen British shores or not). There he married and settled first in Devon, then in Cornwall. Reading between the lines the rats on the Devon property might well have played a role in persuading him to move to Cornwall.

The study of insects had always been a hobby of his, both in Africa and China. In retirement in England he settled down more earnestly to the pursuit of informal entomology, though, as he observed, with not half so rich a field of subjects as on his travels.

On settling down, he wrote novels, though that was no new departure for him; he had already published “The White Kaffir”, “Trooper Fault”, and his most celebrated novel: “The Kingdom that Was”. Significantly, “Strong Waters” and “The Second Leopard” also appeared in 1932, so obviously his apparently idle time in preceding years actually had been anything but idle. It is worth speculating that his productivity in writing might have encouraged his retirement and “going home”.  After settling down he went in for “fairly intensive bee-keeping” as he related in “The Hive”, one World War later.

That his absence from the trenches of World War I was not attributable to lack of patriotic feeling is apparent from the fact that in 1940, at the age of about 47, he joined the Royal Air Force. One wonders what string-pulling might have been necessary to accomplish that at such an advanced age, but of course at that time Britain was desperate for fighting manpower. In due course he found himself in Iceland as Flight Lieutenant in Flying Control. In September 1943 he was invalided out with a peptic ulcer, a condition for which no decisive treatment was to be developed for another forty years or so. As he put it, he was given leave by the Air Force Council to retain his rank — and unfortunately the ulcer he had contracted as well.

Fiction 

Apart from the texts themselves, some idea of the character of his novels, and the way in which he drew on his actual experiences, can be gained from occasional reviews. A particularly interesting example, because it comes from an ex-BSAP officer with personal knowledge of the circumstances and some of the characters drawn from, appears in the magazine “Transvaal Outpost”. At the time of writing this article, the magazine is available in PDF form at the Transvaal branch of the BSAP.

In his  review of ‘Trooper Fault’, Sloman remarks that most of the characters in the book are fictitious, but that they include some real-life names such as Jimmy Blatherwick and Capell, though Sloman states that the latter never started as an ordinary recruit. Trooper Fault himself has the regimental number 1757, which according to the nominal roll was in fact the number of Trooper John Battersby Crompton Lamburn himself. Of Richmal Crompton's “William” stories, Sloman remarks: “Fortunately for J.B.C.Lamburn these stories were published after his BSAP career had ended, otherwise he could have been ragged rotten!”

Whether Lamburn's vein of invention had dried out, or whether his fiction had failed on the market, or whether he simply had become too engrossed in his natural history studies and writings, we cannot say, but once he began to write on natural history after the war, he apparently published no more fiction.

Non-fiction 

In the “Trooper Fault” review, Sloman said that at that time he had tracked down some 14 titles of Lamburn's on natural history subjects, under various names, in particular Lamburn, Lambourne, Crompton. Fewer than fourteen could be located in writing this article.

In writing on scientific matters Lamburn certainly wrote mainly under the name “John Crompton”. As John Crompton he made no claim to scientific expertise, but wrote explicitly as a “layman writing for laymen”.  Accordingly, the books include occasional slip-ups such as “coastal” (instead of “costal”) venule, though of course some of those might well be attributed to printers’ devils. Also, many of his views on theoretical matters such as evolution and genetics were naïve even for his day. Consider for example in chapter 1 of "The Hunting Wasp"; in response to some of Fabre's less apposite criticisms of Darwinian theory, Lamburn has no better response than: "Fabre, of course, takes the short-sighted view. He has no conception of Time with a capital T..." This was true as far as it went, but it was not adequate in the context of Fabre's misunderstandings. However, it would be inappropriate to criticise Crompton's works on such bases. Within his non-technical ambit, he wrote pleasantly, literately, and intelligently, often quite thoughtfully, on a wide range of biological subjects, and he did so constructively and soundly at a level accessible to a wider and younger public than most popular scientific writing.

Most of Lamburn's source material was gleaned from popular and semi-popular material, such as the writings of Jean Henri Fabre, the Peckhams, O.H. Latter, and the like, and he credited such material properly, if informally. Lamburn did not stint his expression of his opinions on such sources, though he was neither pretentious nor destructive in his criticism. He was full of praise for Fabre and the Peckhams, whose endless patience and minute gifts of observation have made them outstanding authorities in the field of entomology to this day.  Lamburn does not disguise his admiration for these extraordinarily meticulous, seminal entomologists.  He notes in 'The Spider': "Fabre ... was disliked by his colleagues. At ease with young people, he was tongue-tied with men, and his timid manners did not endear him to them. But the dislike went further. He wrote about science in a way that ordinary people could understand. This was considered to cheapen the profession. He was a born teacher, and pupils almost fought to attend his classes. Naturally the other masters did not like it, and were ready to take action at the first opportunity."

In spite of his admiration for the greats, Crompton had sufficient strength of character to maintain his own views. For example, he had little patience with Fabre's rejection of some of the assertions of classical Darwinism, which attributed all evolutionary change to gradual increments due entirely to random mutations.  Fabre ridiculed the idea that this mechanism could explain the unbelievable precision of the hunting wasp's injection of precise quantities of venom into the hidden nerve centres of her victims, for example. "In daring to question the conclusions of Fabre I am, I know, going out of my class. But Fabre the theorist is not Fabre the naturalist ... His patience and perseverance ... have brought a rich harvest of knowledge to the world, but that does not mean that we must agree with him when he branches out in other directions." Similarly in the same book Crompton quite reasonably criticises some of Fabre's cruder experiments on instinctive behaviour, and their naive interpretation.

Crompton outspokenly rejected Fabre's arguments that the behaviour of such creatures as hunting-wasps, that operated by injecting venom precisely into particular nerve-centres, could not have arisen by natural selection. Fabre's  views of Darwinism made little impression at the height of Darwin's fame. In the twentieth Century, various refinements to Classical Darwinism, such as the theory of Punctuated Equilibria, and deeper understanding of the principles and practicalities of molecular biology, made serious progress in addressing problems of the mechanism of evolution of complex structures and behaviour patterns. This includes dealing with many difficulties where it seems impossible for an attribute to have arisen in a half-formed state:  until they are perfected, such attributes ought, by the hypothesis itself, to have been eliminated through natural selection.

It is important in this connection however, not to read any malice into the relationship between Darwin and Fabre as Lamburn dealt with the subject. Fabre wrote: "...though facts, as I see them, disincline me to accept his theories, I have none the less the deepest veneration for his noble character and his scientific honesty. I was drafting my letter when the sad news reached me: Darwin was dead..."  No one involved in the matter, not Darwin, not Fabre, and certainly not Crompton in his day, suggested that anything more was involved than a difference of opinion between great spirits.

The alert professional also can glean a lot of useful information from anecdotes derived from Lamburn's personal experiences and those of his correspondents, scientific and non-scientific. He was as willing to quote and credit a country gamekeeper, as the famous myrmecologist William Morton Wheeler.

His books certainly have inspired a fair number of young biologists and it is of some interest to note that after many years out of print some are again appearing in the lists of Amazon.com and similar major vendors. Sloman referred to a (favourable) review of “The Spider” and “The Snake” in the New York Times by Bonnie Bilyeu Gordon In her review, Gordon appositely remarked: "...Crompton blends great enthusiasm with proper fairness. His voice is direct and chatty and sometimes a bit curmudgeonly. He is also often witty. Take this, for example, written on the family of non-web-weaving spiders that includes the tarantula: The web-weaver, having patented a clever device, can now sit back and collect the dividends; the wolf spider, unable to think out anything in the way of a snare, has to pay the penalty by leading a hard, strenuous, and dangerous life..."

Bibliography 

The following titles appear in the British Library Internet catalogue:

Writing as: LAMBOURNE, John B. C.

           The White Kaffir                    	1927
           The Kingdom that Was                	1931,1939
           Trooper Fault                        	1931
           Strong Waters                        	1932
           The Second Leopard                  	1932
           The Unmeasured Place                	1933
           Inky Wooing                         	1935
           Squeeze: A tale of China             	1935
           Trooper in Charge                       	1939

Writing as: CROMPTON, John

           The Hive (Illus A E Bestall)	        1947
           The Hunting Wasp            	        1948
           The Spider (Life of the Spider) with an introduction by Alexander Petrunkevitch	        1950,1955
           Ways of the Ant (Illus J Yunge-Bateman)	1954
           The Living Sea (Illus Denys Ovenden)	1957
           The Snake 	                                1963

Sundry details 
During his time in Iceland Lamburn, the putative original for “William” of the Richmal Crompton books, came into contact with Air Commander Cecil George Wigglesworth, speculated to be the original for “Biggles” of the stories by W. E. Johns. Apparently Johns had known Wigglesworth in World War I.

Sloman mentioned that David John Crompton Lamburn (presumably a son) attested in the BSAP on 5 May 1952 as Constable 4917 and was discharged on 4 May 1955. He added that members serving in Bulawayo in the 1950s recalled him but, again, all attempts failed to locate him at the time of Sloman's writing.

In his book The Hunting Wasp Lamburn refers to "a child two years old" during the 1930s. This is consistent with a son in the BSAP in the 1950s, but no more information on a son was available at the time of writing this article. However, elsewhere he refers to a daughter of "nearly five" (no date given).

References

External links 

 

1893 births
1972 deaths
English science writers
People from Bury, Greater Manchester
English male novelists
20th-century English novelists
20th-century English male writers
English male non-fiction writers
British South Africa Police officers